Kadosh (lit., Sacred) is a 1999 film by Israeli director Amos Gitai. It was entered into the 1999 Cannes Film Festival.

Plot
Kadosh is a bleak drama about the Haredi society. In the opening scene, Meir (Yoram Hattab), a young Talmudic scholar, thanks God in his morning prayers for not being born a woman. At first, the marriage of Meir and his wife, Rivka (Yael Abecassis), appears tender and idyllic, but as the movie progresses, it becomes clear that Meir is concerned with the fact that he is childless after ten years of marriage. Meir's father, the Rabbi of their community in Jerusalem, tells Meir he is required to divorce Rivka because a woman's only function is to have children. Eventually, Meir complies, which destroys Rivka emotionally, and she moves away so that Meir can marry a cousin.

Rivka's younger sister, Malka, marries Yosef in a match arranged by her parents, even though she loves Yaakov, a rock singer, who has abandoned the religious community. When Yosef is sexually cold to her, she leaves for a night with Yaakov; when she returns, Yosef calls her a "slut" and beats her with a belt. She runs out of their apartment.

Meir, having divorced Rivka and re-married, shows up at Rivka's apartment on the Purim holiday (when men traditionally get drunk), and wants to be with her (a Haredi man would normally never be alone with a woman who is not his wife). She retreats initially. We do not see what happens, but when Malka runs to Rivka's apartment after Yosef beats her, Rivka babbles about being pregnant.

In a scene which could be a dream or allegory, Rivka comes to Meir, who is sleeping, lies down with him, and drapes herself all over him, but he does not wake up (nor is his new wife present, suggesting this is not actually the storyline). Eventually, she falls asleep on top of him. He wakes up, and cannot rouse her. He shakes Rivka, and tries to wake her, as she has apparently died of a broken heart. The movie ends with Malka, alone after having left Yosef, looking over the city of Jerusalem.

The movie was reviewed in the New York Times.

Cast
 Yaël Abecassis - Rivka
 Yoram Hattab - Meïr
 Meital Barda - Malka
 Uri Klauzner - Yossef (as Uri Ran-Klausner)
 Yussuf Abu-Warda - Rav Shimon
 Lea Koenig - Elisheva (as Lea Koenig)
 Sami Huri - Yaakov
 Rivka Michaeli - Gynaecologist
 Samuel Calderon - Uncle Shmouel
 Noa Dori - Noa
 Shireen Kadivar - Lexa

References

External links
 
 Reviews of Kadosh

1999 drama films
1999 films
Films directed by Amos Gitai
1990s Hebrew-language films
Films about Orthodox and Hasidic Jews
Anti-Orthodox Judaism sentiment
French drama films
Israeli drama films
1990s French films